Rita Karin (born Rita Karpinowicz; October 24, 1919 – September 10, 1993) was a Polish-born American actress best known for her role as Jackie Mason's mother on the 1989 TV series Chicken Soup. She also appeared as Meryl Streep's Brooklyn landlady who appears at the beginning of Sophie's Choice. Her voice can be heard singing children's songs from the camps in the Holocaust Museum in Washington, D.C.

Born to Moses Karpinowicz and Rachel Levitan in Wilno, Poland (present-day Vilnius, Lithuania), Rita and her husband, Norbert Horowitz, a graduate of the Moscow State Jewish Theater, create a Yiddish theater that performed for Holocaust survivors throughout Europe. The couple emigrated in 1948 to the United States, where she acted in the Yiddish theater in New York City. She and other actors read the works of Sholom Aleichem at the home of Bel Kaufman, Aleichem's granddaughter, each year on the anniversary of the writer's death.

Death
Rita Karin died at 73 from undisclosed causes in New York City. She was survived by her son, Dr. Michael Horowitz, and daughter, Mrs. Rochelle Axelrod, and five grandchildren.

Filmography

References

1919 births
1993 deaths
20th-century American actresses
American film actresses
American stage actresses
American television actresses
Actresses from Vilnius
Polish emigrants to the United States